The enzyme acetyl-CoA hydrolase (EC 3.1.2.1) catalyzes the reaction

acetyl-CoA + H2O  CoA + acetate

This enzyme belongs to the family of hydrolases, specifically those acting on thioester bonds.  The systematic name is CoA thiol esterase.  This enzyme participates in pyruvate metabolism.

Structural studies

As of late 2007, only one structure has been solved for this class of enzymes, with the PDB accession code .

See also
Acetyl-CoA synthetase and ACSS2, enzymes that perform the reverse reaction using ATP

References

 

EC 3.1.2
Enzymes of known structure